Trevor Christopher Booker (born 26 February 1969) is an English former professional footballer who played in the Football League, as a forward. He was born in Lambeth.

References

Sources
Profile at Neil Brown

1969 births
Living people
Footballers from Lambeth
English footballers
Association football forwards
Millwall F.C. players
Maidstone United F.C. (1897) players
Fisher Athletic F.C. players
Welling United F.C. players
English Football League players